Typhlacontias kataviensis, the Katavi blind dart skink, is a species of lizard which is endemic to Tanzania.

References

kataviensis
Reptiles of Tanzania
Reptiles described in 2006
Taxa named by Donald George Broadley